Ilektra Apostolou (1912 - 26 July 1944) was a member of the Young Communist League of Greece, United Panhellenic Organization of Youth and the Communist Party of Greece, participating in the Greek Resistance. She was also a proponent of woman's rights. She was executed by the collaborationist State Special Security Directorate, which was a section of Hellenic Gendarmerie, because of her activity. Besides her action, she is known for the questioning she had with her interrogator: "Where are you from? I am from Greece. Where do you live? In Greece. What is your name? Greek. Who are your collaborators? They're all Greeks. What is your job? I work for the Greek people."

References

Sources 
Βιογραφική Εγκυκλοπαίδεια του Νεωτέρου Ελληνισμού 1830-2010 - Αρχεία Ελληνικής Βιογραφίας, Εκδόσεις Μέτρον, 2011, τόμος Α΄, σελ. 122
Ιστορία της Αντίστασης 1940-45, Εκδόσεις Αυλός, Αθήνα 1979
Το τιμωρό χέρι του λαού. Η δράση του ΕΛΑΣ και της ΟΠΛΑ στην κατεχόμενη πρωτεύουσα 1942-1944, Ιάσονας Χανδρινός, Εκδόσεις Θεμέλιο, Αθήνα 2012
Ακροναυπλία. Θρύλος και πραγματικότητα, Γιάννης Μανούσακας, Εκδόσεις Δωρικός, Αθήνα 1978

1912 births
1944 deaths
Greek communists
Greek Resistance members
National Liberation Front (Greece) members
Women in World War II
Executed Greek people
People from Athens